A by-election for the seat of Illawarra in the New South Wales Legislative Assembly was held on 3 October 1891 because the Elections and Qualifications Committee declared that the election of John Nicholson and Andrew Lysaght Sr. at the election for Illawarra in June was void because of there were insufficient printed ballot papers and handwritten papers were used.

Dates

Result

|  | 
	| colspan="2"   |  hold 1
	| rowspan="2" colspan="3" style="text-align:center;" | 
|-
|  | 
	| colspan="2"   |  gain 1 from 

The election of John Nicholson and Andrew Lysaght Sr. at the election for Illawarra in June was declared void.

See also
Electoral results for the district of Illawarra
List of New South Wales state by-elections

References

1891 elections in Australia
New South Wales state by-elections
1890s in New South Wales